Miss Russia is a national beauty pageant in Russia. It selects the Russian representatives to compete in two of the major beauty pageants: Miss World and Miss Universe.

History

The pageant has been running since 1992; however, there was no Miss Russia 1994, 2000 or 2008.

Since 2007, the winner of Miss Russia represents her country in both Miss World and Miss Universe. However, if she is unable to participate, a runner-up is sent instead.
 
Russia has won three major international titles: Miss World 1992, Miss Universe 2002, although later dethroned, and Miss World 2008.

It is estimated that every Miss Russia auditions, over 80,000-100,000 applicants are being processed annually.

International Winners
Russian representatives under Miss Russia Organization who won International titles.
Miss Universe
2002 — Oxana Fedorova  
Miss World
2008 — Ksenia Sukhinova
1992 — Julia Kourotchkina
Miss Europe
2002 — Svetlana Koroleva
1999 — Yelena Rogozhina

Titleholders

Wins by regions

Winners' gallery

Titleholders under Miss Russia org.
The following women have represented Russia under Miss Russia Organization in the following international beauty pageants: Miss Universe and Miss World. Traditionally, winning Miss Russia gives titleholders the right to represent Russia at both Miss Universe, and continuing the winner could be competing at Miss Universe and Miss World. However, in 2015, the winner of Miss Russia has been sent to Miss World, while the first runner-up has been sent to Miss Universe due to the dates of the two pageants often conflicting with each other.

Miss Universe Russia

Miss Universe began in 1952, and Russia debuted in the competition in 1994. Since their debut, they have placed eight times, securing one winner, one runner-up, and six semi-finalists. In fact from the past the main of Miss Russia has a right to represent her country at Miss Universe. Between 2004 and 2006 a Miss Universe Russia contest selected the winner to Miss Universe. On occasion, when the winner does not qualify (due to age) for either contest, a runner-up is sent.

Miss World Russia

Miss World began in 1951, and Russia debuted in the competition in 1992. Since their debut, they have placed ten times, securing two winners, one runner-up, and seven semi-finalists. The Miss Russia franchised Miss World since 2007. Since that year winner and runner-up at Miss Russia have a right to compete at Miss World. — Here Russian representatives at Miss World since Miss Russia franchised the license of Miss World.

See also
Miss USSR
Miss International Russia
Krasa Rossii (Miss Earth Russia)

References

External links

 Miss Russia Official site 

 
Russia
Recurring events established in 1993
Beauty pageants in Russia
Russian awards